Oak Hall School is a private school in Gainesville, Florida, that was founded in 1970 as a segregation academy.

History
Oak Hall was founded in 1970, the same year that Gainesville finished desegregation of their high schools.

Although technically a private school, the school was largely built with funds provided by industrial revenue bonds raised by Alachua County. It is a Pre-K through 12 school, but was not always that way. The school's elementary, or "Lower School", was originally a separate campus by the name of Martha Manson Academy. The Headmaster there gave the school to Oak Hall in 2001, creating the Pre-K through 12 campus that the school has today.

The school established a sister school relationship with the Changzhou #2 Middle/High School.

Facilities
The school is sited on a  campus and includes a 400-seat theater, art and photography center, media center, science labs, gymnasium, lighted soccer field, lighted football field, brand new tennis courts, an unlighted baseball field, a softball field, and as well as many other outdoor basketball, pickleball, tennis, and 4-square courts.

Athletics and extracurriculars
Oak Hall has a Spanish program and was placed first in Division 1A at the Florida State Spanish Conference in 2010. It also has a Latin program and was placed first in the Senior Division and first in the Junior Division at the 2010 FJCL State Forum held between April 14, 2010 and April 17, 2010. The Senior Division won again in 2012, 2014. 2015, and 2016. Its Certamen team has won multiple state and collegiate level tournaments.

Notable alumni
Brian Ellington, baseball player
Kevin Maris, son of hall of fame baseball player, Roger Maris

References

External links
 Official site

Private high schools in Florida
Educational institutions established in 1970
Education in Gainesville, Florida
High schools in Alachua County, Florida
Private middle schools in Florida
Private elementary schools in Florida
Preparatory schools in Florida
Segregation academies in Florida